Live Home 3D is a virtual home design software for  macOS, Windows 10 computers and iOS.

The app allows design in both 2D and 3D, and the creation of high-resolution interior and exterior renderings, on video walkthrough or 360-degree panoramic images.

References

External links 

 

Computer-aided design software
Windows multimedia software
MacOS software
Architectural design
Interior design